A Heart in the Drawer, is a 2016 Italian short film against femicide written and directed by Roberto Leoni and produced by Mario D'Andrea. First release 24 September 2016 (Montreal, Canada) Views of the World Film & Music Festival 2016 - Official Selection  First Italian release 29 November 2017 (Rome, Italy) RIFF Rome International Film Festival 2017

Plot 
A young woman's sensitive gesture is misunderstood by her partner causing an umpteenth row until a tragic end... But also this one will be officially filed as an accident, like too many other femicides caused by domestic violence... Under the auspices of Amnesty International in Italy  
"In five minutes of dramatic live broadcasting we assist to one of the many femicides. A shock that provokes an immediate reaction of condemn and refusal."
Roberto Leoni

Cast 
 Marianna Di Martino as Francesca
 Marco Basile as Nicolò

References

External links 
  
 A Heart in the Drawer trailer

2016 drama films
2016 short films
2010s Italian films
2010s Italian-language films
Films about violence against women
Italian drama films
Italian short films